The 2001 Ericsson Open was a tennis tournament played on outdoor hard courts. It was the 17th edition of the Miami Masters and was part of the Tennis Masters Series of the 2001 ATP Tour and of Tier I of the 2001 WTA Tour. Both the men's and women's events took place at the Tennis Center at Crandon Park in Key Biscayne, Florida in the United States from March 19 through April 2, 2001.

Finals

Men's singles

 Andre Agassi defeated  Jan-Michael Gambill 7–6(7–4), 6–1, 6–0
 It was Agassi's 3rd title of the year and the 49th of his career. It was his 2nd Masters title of the year and his 12th overall. It was his 4th title at the event after winning in 1990, 1995 and 1996.

Women's singles

 Venus Williams defeated  Jennifer Capriati 4–6, 6–1, 7–6(7–4)
 It was Williams' 2nd title of the year and the 26th of her career. It was her 1st Tier I title of the year and her 5th overall. It was her 3rd title at the event after winning in 1998 and 1999.

Men's doubles

 Jiří Novák /  David Rikl defeated  Jonas Björkman /  Todd Woodbridge 7–5, 7–6(7–3)
 It was Novák's 1st title of the year and the 16th of his career. It was Rikl's 1st title of the year and the 20th of his career.

Women's doubles

 Arantxa Sánchez Vicario /  Nathalie Tauziat defeated  Lisa Raymond /  Rennae Stubbs 6–0, 6–4
 It was Sánchez Vicario's 1st title of the year and the 93rd of her career. It was Tauziat's 1st title of the year and the 30th of his career.

External links
 Official website
 ATP Tournament Profile
 WTA Tournament Profile

 
Ericsson Open
Ericsson Open
Ericsson Open
Miami Open (tennis)
Ericsson Open
Ericsson Open
Ericsson Open